is a Japanese sprinter competing primarily in the 200 metres. He finished fourth at the 2015 Asian Championships. As part of the Japanese 4 × 100 metres relay, he won medals at the 2015 IAAF World Relays and 2015 Summer Universiade.

Competition record

Personal bests
Outdoor
100 metres – 10.51 (-0.3 m/s) (Liège 2014)
200 metres – 20.45 (+0.6 m/s) (Fukuroi 2014)

References

External links 
 
 

1994 births
Living people
Japanese male sprinters
World Athletics Championships athletes for Japan
Universiade medalists in athletics (track and field)
Universiade gold medalists for Japan
Medalists at the 2015 Summer Universiade
21st-century Japanese people